Beverley Kingston  (born 1941) is an Australian historian. She is author of volume 3 of the Oxford History of Australia.

Early life and education 
Beverley Rhonda Kingston was born in Sydney, New South Wales in 1941, but grew up in north Queensland where her father was a manager with the Commonwealth Bank. She attended Presbyterian Girls' College in Warwick, Queensland as a boarder before enrolling in the University of Queensland, from which she graduated in 1963 with a BA (hons). Moving to Melbourne, she completed a PhD at Monash University in 1968.

Career 
Kingston joined the University of New South Wales in 1969 and worked there for 30 years, retiring in 1999.   

She has been actively involved in the Australian Dictionary of Biography (ADB) since 1974, including as chair of the NSW advisory group (1994–) and as a member of the Editorial Board (1996–). Her thirty contributions to the ADB include biographies of feminist Maybanke Anderson, poet Dorothea Mackellar and editor Beatrice Deloitte Davis.

Kingston was elected Fellow of the Academy of the Social Sciences in Australia in 1994.

Works

References 

1941 births
Living people
University of Queensland alumni
Monash University alumni
Academic staff of the University of New South Wales
Australian women historians
Fellows of the Academy of the Social Sciences in Australia